Jitbahadur Moktan (born 31 August 1979) is a male Nepalese recurve archer. He competed in the archery competition at the 2016 Summer Olympics in Rio de Janeiro. He is a member of the Manang Marshyangdi Archery Team based in Kathmandu.

References

External links
 
 

Nepalese male archers
Living people
1979 births
Archers at the 2016 Summer Olympics
Olympic archers of Nepal
Archers at the 2010 Asian Games
Archers at the 2014 Asian Games
Asian Games competitors for Nepal